Nikita Yuryevich Chaplin (born July 28, 1982, Ramenskoye, Moscow Oblast) is a Russian political figure and a deputy of the 8th State Duma.

Early life and education 
In 2004 he graduated with distinction from the Law School of Moscow State University.

Career 
From 1999 to 2007, he worked as a lawyer and director of several large law firms. In 2007–2021, he was a deputy of Moscow Oblast Duma of the 4th, 5th, and 6th convocations. In August 2021 Chaplin was assigned a special representative of the regional government in the urban district of Kolomna. Since September 2021, he has served as a deputy of the 8th State Duma.

Awards 

 Order "For Merit to the Fatherland"
 Medal Saint Basil of Ryazan, 1st class

References

1982 births
Living people
People from Ramensky District
United Russia politicians
21st-century Russian politicians
Eighth convocation members of the State Duma (Russian Federation)
Moscow State University alumni